The Indian national cricket team toured Ceylon in March to April 1945 and played five matches including an international against the Ceylon national team. As Ceylon had not then achieved Test status, the international is classified as a first-class match. Played at the Paikiasothy Saravanamuttu Stadium in Colombo, the match was impacted by rain and ended in a draw. India were captained by Vijay Merchant and Ceylon by Sargo Jayawickreme.

References

External links

1945 in Indian cricket
1945 in Ceylon
1945
International cricket competitions from 1918–19 to 1945
Sri Lankan cricket seasons from 1880–81 to 1971–72